Ayman Aiki (born 25 June 2005) is a French professional footballer who plays as a forward for  club Saint-Étienne.

Club career 
Born in Champigny-sur-Marne, Aiki began his career playing for Bry FC and RC Joinville. In 2020, he joined Saint-Étienne. During the 2021–22 season, Aiki played for the club's under-19 side, and was considered the "biggest attacking talent" in Sainté's youth academy. Despite only being 16 years old, he also participated in several reserve team matches in the Championnat National 3.

On 8 June 2022, Aiki signed his first professional contract with Saint-Étienne, a deal lasting into 2025. He became the first player at the club born in 2005 to sign a pro contract. On 30 July, Aiki made his professional debut for Saint-Étienne in a 2–1 Ligue 2 defeat away to Dijon, scoring his side's only goal after having come on as a substitute. At the age of 17 years and 35 days, he became the youngest player to score a league goal for Saint-Étienne.

International career 
Aiki received his maiden call-up to the France U17 national team in November 2021. In 2022, he was included in the team's squad for the UEFA European Under-17 Championship in Israel. During France's second group stage match against Bulgaria, Aiki scored a goal that contributed to his team's 4–0 victory. France went on to win the tournament.

Personal life 
Born in France, Aiki is of Burkinabè descent. He holds both French and Burkinabè citizenship.

Honours 

France U17
 UEFA European Under-17 Championship: 2022

References

External links 
  
 
 

2005 births
Living people
People from Champigny-sur-Marne
Footballers from Val-de-Marne
French footballers
Burkinabé footballers
French sportspeople of Burkinabé descent
Citizens of Burkina Faso through descent
Black French sportspeople
Association football forwards
AS Saint-Étienne players
Championnat National 3 players
Ligue 2 players
France youth international footballers